Haplogroup N is a human mitochondrial DNA (mtDNA) clade. A macrohaplogroup, its descendant lineages are distributed across many continents. Like its sibling macrohaplogroup M, macrohaplogroup N is a descendant of the haplogroup L3.

All mtDNA haplogroups found outside of Africa are descendants of either haplogroup N or its sibling haplogroup M. M and N are the signature maternal haplogroups that define the theory of the recent African origin of modern humans and subsequent early human migrations around the world. The global distribution of haplogroups N and M indicates that there was likely at least one major prehistoric migration of humans out of Africa, with both N and M later evolving outside the continent.

Origins

There is widespread agreement in the scientific community concerning the African ancestry of haplogroup L3 (haplogroup N's parent clade). However, whether or not the mutations which define haplogroup N itself first occurred within Asia or Africa has been a subject for ongoing discussion and study.
The out of Africa hypothesis has gained generalized consensus. However, many specific questions remain unsettled. To know whether the two M and N macrohaplogroups that colonized Eurasia were already present in Africa before the exit is puzzling.

Torroni et al. 2006 state that Haplogroups M, N and R occurred somewhere between East Africa and the Persian Gulf.

Also related to the origins of haplogroup N is whether ancestral haplogroups M, N and R were part of the same migration out of Africa, or whether Haplogroup N left Africa via the Northern route through the Levant, and M left Africa via Horn of Africa. This theory was suggested because haplogroup N is by far the predominant haplogroup in Western Eurasia, and haplogroup M is absent in Western Eurasia, but is predominant in India and is common in regions East of India. However, the mitochondrial DNA variation in isolated "relict" populations in southeast Asia and among Indigenous Australians supports the view that there was only a single dispersal from Africa. Southeast Asian populations and Indigenous Australians all possess deep rooted clades of both haplogroups M and N. The distribution of the earliest branches within haplogroups M, N, and R across Eurasia and Oceania therefore supports a three-founder-mtDNA scenario and a single migration route out of Africa. These findings also highlight the importance of Indian subcontinent in the early genetic history of human settlement and expansion.

Asian origin hypothesis
The hypothesis of Asia as the place of origin of haplogroup N is supported by the following:
 Haplogroup N is found in all parts of the world but has low frequencies in Sub-Saharan Africa. According to a number of studies, the presence of Haplogroup N in Africa is most likely the result of back migration from Eurasia.
 The oldest clades of macrohaplogroup N are found in Asia and Australia.
 It would be paradoxical that haplogroup N had traveled all the distance to Australia or New World yet failed to affect other populations within Africa besides North Africans and Horn Africans.
 The mitochondrial DNA variation in isolated "relict" populations in southeast Asia supports the view that there was only a single dispersal from Africa. The distribution of the earliest branches within haplogroups M, N, and R across Eurasia and Oceania provides additional evidence for a three-founder-mtDNA scenario and a single migration route out of Africa. These findings also highlight the importance of Indian subcontinent in the early genetic history of human settlement and expansion. Therefore, N's history is similar to M and R which have their most probable origin in South Asia.

A study (Vai et al. 2019), finds a basal branch of maternal haplogroup N in early Neolithic North African remains from the Libyan site of Takarkori. The authors propose that N most likely split from L3 in the Arabian peninsula and later migrated back to North Africa, with its sister haplogroup M also likely splitting from L3 in the Middle East, but also suggest that N may have possibly diverged in North Africa, and state that more information is necessary to be certain.

African origin hypothesis
According to Toomas Kivisild "the lack of L3 lineages other than M and N in India and among non-African mitochondria in general suggests that the earliest migration(s) of modern humans already carried these two mtDNA ancestors, via a departure route over the Horn of Africa.

In 2019, a study by Vai et al. presented evidence of a basal branch of haplogroup N from the Neolithic Sahara. They suggest that N either diverged from haplogroup L3 in the Near East (possibly in the Arabian peninsula, following the exit of L3 from Africa), then back-migrated to North Africa, or that it instead may have originated in North Africa (having diverged from L3 there).

Distribution

Haplogroup N is derived from the ancestral L3 macrohaplogroup, which represents the migration discussed in the theory of the recent African origin of modern humans. Haplogroup N is the ancestral haplogroup to almost all clades today distributed in Europe and Oceania, as well as many found in Asia and the Americas. It is believed to have arisen at a similar time to haplogroup M. Haplogroup N subclades like haplogroup U6 are also found at high to low frequencies in northwest and northeast Africa due to a back migration from Europe or Asia during the Paleolithic ca. 46,000 ybp, the estimated age of the basal U6* clade. Other haplogroups common in Western Eurasia, such as R0, J, and T, are also common in North Africa and parts of East Africa.

The haplogroup N descendant lineage U6 has been found among Iberomaurusian specimens at the Taforalt site, which date from the Epipaleolithic. In Sub-Saharan Africa, several ancient samples of N have been found, the oldest so far being K1a dating back to about 2000 BC in Kenya. Additionally, haplogroup N predominated among ancient Egyptian mummies excavated at the Abusir el-Meleq archaeological site in Middle Egypt, which date from the Pre-Ptolemaic/late New Kingdom, Ptolemaic, and Roman periods.

Subgroups distribution
Haplogroup N's derived clades include the macro-haplogroup R and its descendants, and haplogroups A, I, S, W, X, and Y.

Rare unclassified haplogroup N* has been found among fossils belonging to the Cardial and Epicardial culture (Cardium pottery) and the Pre-Pottery Neolithic B. A rare unclassified form of N has been also been reported in modern Algeria.
 Haplogroup N1'5
 Haplogroup N1 – found in Africa .
 Haplogroup N1b – found in Middle East, Egypt (Gurna), Caucasus and Europe.
 N1a'c'd'e'I
 Haplogroup N1c – Northern Saudi Arabia, Turkey 
 N1a'd'e'I
 Haplogroup N1d – India
 N1a'e'I
 Haplogroup N1a – Arabian Peninsula and Northeast Africa. Found also in Central Asia and Southern Siberia. This branch is well attested in ancient people from various cultures of Neolithic Europe, from Hungary to Spain, and among the earliest farmers of Anatolia.
 N1e'I
 Haplogroup N1e – found in Balochs, Burushos, and Buryats
 Haplogroup I – West Eurasia and South Asia.
 Haplogroup N5 – found in India.
 Haplogroup N2
 Haplogroup N2a – small clade found in West Europe.
 Haplogroup W – found in Western Eurasia and South Asia
 Haplogroup N3 – all subgroups have so far only been found in Belarus
 Haplogroup N3a
 Haplogroup N3a1
 Haplogroup N3b
 Haplogroup N7 – all subgroups have so far only been found in Cambodia
 Haplogroup N7a
 Haplogroup N7a1
 Haplogroup N7a2
 Haplogroup N7b
 Haplogroup N8 – found in China.
 Haplogroup N9 – found in Far East. [TMRCA 45,709.7 ± 7,931.5 ybp; CI=95%]
 Haplogroup N9a [TMRCA 17,520.4 ± 4,389.8 ybp; CI=95%]
 Haplogroup N9a12 – Khon Mueang (Pai District)
 Haplogroup N9a-C16261T
 Haplogroup N9a-C16261T* – Vietnam (Kinh)
 Haplogroup N9a-A4129G-A4913G-T12354C-A12612G-C12636T-T16311C!!! – Tashkurgan (Kyrgyz)
 Haplogroup N9a1'3 [TMRCA 15,007.4 ± 6,060.1 ybp; CI=95%]
 Haplogroup N9a1 – Chinese (Hakka in Taiwan, etc.), She, Tu, Uyghur, Tuvan, Mongolia, Khamnigan, Korea, Japan [TMRCA 9,200 (95% CI 7,100 <-> 11,600) ybp]
 Haplogroup N9a1a – Chinese (Sichuan, Zhanjiang, etc.) [TMRCA 7,300 (95% CI 3,800 <-> 12,800) ybp]
 Haplogroup N9a1b – Kyrgyz (Tashkurgan)
 Haplogroup N9a1c – Vietnam (Tay people), Thailand (Khon Mueang from Chiang Mai Province, Lao Isan from Loei Province)
 Haplogroup N9a3 – China [TMRCA 11,500 (95% CI 7,500 <-> 16,800) ybp]
 Haplogroup N9a3a – Japan, Korean (Seoul), Taiwan (incl. Paiwan), Thailand (Mon from Lopburi Province and Kanchanaburi Province), China, Uyghur, Kyrgyz (Tashkurgan), Kazakhstan, Buryat, Russia (Belgorod, Chechen Republic, etc.), Ukraine, Moldova, Belarus, Lithuania, Poland, Czech (West Bohemia), Hungary, Austria, Germany [TMRCA 8,280.9 ± 5,124.4 ybp; CI=95%]
 Haplogroup N9a2'4'5'11 [TMRCA 15,305.4 ± 4,022.6 ybp; CI=95%]
 Haplogroup N9a2 – Japan, Korea, China (Barghut in Hulunbuir, Uyghur, etc.) [TMRCA 10,700 (95% CI 8,200 <-> 13,800) ybp]
 Haplogroup N9a2a – Japan, Korea, Uyghur [TMRCA 8,100 (95% CI 6,500 <-> 10,000) ybp]
 Haplogroup N9a2a1 – Japan [TMRCA 4,200 (95% CI 1,850 <-> 8,400) ybp]
 Haplogroup N9a2a2 – Japan, Korea, Volga-Ural region (Tatar) [TMRCA 5,700 (95% CI 3,500 <-> 8,900) ybp]
 Haplogroup N9a2a3 – Japan, Hulun-Buir region (Barghut) [TMRCA 4,700 (95% CI 2,400 <-> 8,400) ybp]
 Haplogroup N9a2a4 – Japan [TMRCA 2,800 (95% CI 600 <-> 7,900) ybp]
 Haplogroup N9a2b – China
 Haplogroup N9a2c [TMRCA 7,200 (95% CI 3,600 <-> 12,700) ybp]
 Haplogroup N9a2c* – Japan
 Haplogroup N9a2c1 – Japan, Korea, Uyghur [TMRCA 2,600 (95% CI 1,250 <-> 4,900) ybp]
 Haplogroup N9a2d – Japan, Korea [TMRCA 5,200 (95% CI 1,800 <-> 12,000) ybp]
 Haplogroup N9a2e – China
 Haplogroup N9a4 – Malaysia [TMRCA 7,900 (95% CI 3,900 <-> 14,300) ybp]
 Haplogroup N9a4a – Japan [TMRCA 4,400 (95% CI 1,500 <-> 10,200) ybp]
 Haplogroup N9a4b [TMRCA 5,700 (95% CI 2,400 <-> 11,400) ybp]
 Haplogroup N9a4b* – Japan
 Haplogroup N9a4b1 – China (Minnan in Taiwan, etc.)
 Haplogroup N9a4b2 – China
 Haplogroup N9a5 [TMRCA 8,700 (95% CI 4,700 <-> 15,000) ybp]
 Haplogroup N9a5* – Korea
 Haplogroup N9a5a – Japan
 Haplogroup N9a5b – Japan [TMRCA 5,300 (95% CI 1,150 <-> 15,300) ybp]
 Haplogroup N9a11 – Taiwan (Hakka, Minnan), Laos (Lao from Luang Prabang)
 Haplogroup N9a6 – Thailand (Phuan from Lopburi Province, Khon Mueang from Lamphun Province, Phutai from Sakon Nakhon Province, Lawa from Mae Hong Son Province, Soa from Sakon Nakhon Province), Vietnam, Sumatra [TMRCA 11,972.5 ± 5,491.7 ybp; CI=95%]
 Haplogroup N9a6a – Cambodia (Khmer), Malaysia (Bidayuh, Jehai, Temuan, Kensiu), Sumatra, Sundanese
 Haplogroup N9a6b – Malaysia (Seletar)
 Haplogroup N9a7 – Japan
 Haplogroup N9a8 – Japan, China, Buryat
 Haplogroup N9a9 – Chelkans (Biyka, Turochak), Tubalar (North-East Altai), Kyrgyz (Kyrgyzstan), China, Ukraine (Vinnytsia Oblast), Romania (10th century AD Dobruja)
 Haplogroup N9a10 – Thailand (Khon Mueang from Mae Hong Son Province, Chiang Mai Province, Lamphun Province, and Lampang Province, Shan from Mae Hong Son Province, Lao Isan from Loei Province, Black Tai from Kanchanaburi Province, Phuan from Sukhothai Province and Phichit Province, Mon from Kanchanaburi Province), Laos (Lao from Luang Prabang, Hmong), Vietnam (Tay Nung), China (incl. Han in Chongqing)
 Haplogroup N9a10a – China, Taiwan (Ami)
 Haplogroup N9a10a1 – Chinese (Suzhou)
 Haplogroup N9a10a2 – Philippines (Ivatan), Taiwan (Ami)
 Haplogroup N9a10a2a – Taiwan (Atayal, Tsou)
 Haplogroup N9a10b – China
 Haplogroup N9b – Japan, Udegey, Nanai, Korea [TMRCA 14,885.6 ± 4,092.5 ybp; CI=95%]
 Haplogroup N9b1 – Japan [TMRCA 11,859.3 ± 3,760.2 ybp; CI=95%]
 Haplogroup N9b1a – Japan [TMRCA 10,645.2 ± 3,690.3 ybp; CI=95%]
 Haplogroup N9b1b – Japan [TMRCA 2,746.5 ± 2,947.0 ybp; CI=95%]
 Haplogroup N9b1c – Japan [TMRCA 6,987.8 ± 4,967.0 ybp; CI=95%]
 Haplogroup N9b1c1 – Japan
 Haplogroup N9b2 – Japan [TMRCA 13,369.7 ± 4,110.0 ybp; CI=95%]
 Haplogroup N9b2a – Japan
 Haplogroup N9b3 – Japan [TMRCA 7,629.8 ± 6,007.6 ybp; CI=95%]
 Haplogroup N9b4 – Japan, Ulchi
 Haplogroup Y – found especially among Nivkhs, Ulchs, Nanais, Negidals, Ainus, and the population of Nias Island, with a moderate frequency among other Tungusic peoples, Koreans, Mongols, Koryaks, Itelmens, Chinese, Japanese, Tajiks, Island Southeast Asians (including Taiwanese aborigines), and some Turkic peoples [TMRCA 24,576.4 ± 7,083.2 ybp; CI=95%]
 Haplogroup Y1 – Korea, Taiwan (Minnan), Thailand (Iu Mien from Phayao Province), Poland, Slovakia, Czech Republic [TMRCA 14,689.5 ± 5,264.3 ybp; CI=95%]
 Haplogroup Y1a – Nivkh, Ulchi, Hezhen, Udegey, Even, Zabaikal Buryat, Mongolian, Daur, Korea, Han, Tibet, Ukraine [TMRCA 7,467.5 ± 5,526.7 ybp; CI=95%]
 Haplogroup Y1a1 – Uyghur, Kyrgyz, Yakut, Buryat, Hezhen, Udegey, Evenk (Taimyr), Ket, Slovakia, Romania, Hungary, Turkey
 Haplogroup Y1a2 – Koryak, Even (Kamchatka)
 Haplogroup Y1b – Volga Tatar [TMRCA 9,222.8 ± 4,967.0 ybp; CI=95%]
 Haplogroup Y1b1 – Chinese (Han from Lanzhou, etc.), Japanese, Korea, Russia
 Haplogroup Y1c - Korea (especially Jeju Island), Khamnigan, Uyghur, Canada
 Haplogroup Y2 – Chinese, Japanese, Korean, Khamnigan, South Africa (Cape Coloured) [TMRCA 7,279.3 ± 2,894.5 ybp; CI=95%]
 Haplogroup Y2a – Taiwan (Atayal, Saisiyat, Tsou), Philippines (Maranao), Brunei, Indonesia, Malaysia, Hawaii, USA (Hispanic), Spain, Ireland [TMRCA 4,929.5 ± 2,789.6 ybp; CI=95%]
 Haplogroup Y2a1 - Philippines (Bugkalot, Ivatan, Surigaonon, Manobo, Mamanwa, etc.), Malaysia (Sabah, Acheh Malay from Kedah, Banjar from Perak), Indonesia ( from Sumatra, Medan, Bangka, Mandar from Sulawesi, etc.)
 Haplogroup Y2a1a - Philippines (Kankanaey, Ifugao), USA (Hispanic)
 Haplogroup Y2b – Japan, South Korea, Buryat [TMRCA 1,741.8 ± 3,454.2 ybp; CI=95%]
 Haplogroup N10 – found in China (Han from Shanghai, Jiangsu, Fujian, Guangdong, and Yunnan, Hani and Yi from Yunnan, She from Guizhou, Uzbek from Xinjiang) and Southeast Asia (Thailand, Indonesia, Vietnam, Malaysia).
 Haplogroup N11 – Mainland China & Philippines: Han Chinese (Yunnan, Sichuan, and Hubei), Tibetan (Xizang), Dongxiang (Gansu), Oroqen (Inner Mongolia) and Mamanwa (Philippines).
 N11a 
 N11a1 
 N11a1a – ethnicity unknown, Zhejiang (eastern China)
 N11a1b – Uyghur, Xinjiang (western China)
 N11a2 – ethnicity unknown, China
 N11b – Mamanwa, Philippines

 Haplogroup O or N12- found among Indigenous Australians and the Floresians of Indonesia.
 Haplogroup N13 – Aboriginal Australians
 Haplogroup N14 – Aboriginal Australians
 Haplogroup N21 – In ethnic Malays from Malaysia and Indonesia.
 Haplogroup N22 – Southeast Asia, Bangladesh, India, Japan
 Haplogroup A – found in Central and East Asia, as well as among Native Americans.
Haplogroup S – extended among Aboriginal Australians.
 Haplogroup X – found most often in Western Eurasia, but also present in the Americas.
 Haplogroup X1 – found primarily in North Africa as well as in some populations of the Levant, notably among the Druze
 Haplogroup X2 – found in Western Eurasia, Siberia and among Native Americans
 Haplogroup R – a very extended and diversified macro-haplogroup.

Subclades

Tree
This phylogenetic tree of haplogroup N subclades is based on the paper by Mannis van Oven and Manfred Kayser Updated comprehensive phylogenetic tree of global human mitochondrial DNA variation and subsequent published research.
 N
 N1'5
 N1
 N1a'c'd'e'I
 N1a'd'e'I
 N1a'e'I
 N1a
 N1a1
 N1a1a
 N1e'I
 I
 N1e
 N1d
 N1c
 N1b
 N1b1
 N1b1a
 N1b1b
 N1b1c
 N1b1d
 N1b2
 N5
 N2
 N2a
 W
 N3
N3a
N3a1
N3b
 N7
N7a
N7a1
N7a2
N7b
 N8
 N9
 N9a
 N9a1'3
 N9a1
 N9a3
 N9a2'4'5
 N9a2
 N9a2a'b
 N9a2a
 N9a2b
 N9a2c
 N9a2d
 N9a4
 N9a5
 N9a6
 N9a6a
 N9b
 N9b1
 N9b1a
 N9b1b
 N9b1c
 N9b1c1
 N9b2
 N9b3
 Y
 N10
 N10a
 N10b
 N11
 N11a
 N11a1
 N11a2
 N11b
 N13
 N14
 N21
 N22
 A
 O
 O1
 S
 X
 R

See also

References

External links 

 Haplogroup N
 Mannis van Oven's – mtDNA subtree N
 Spread of Haplogroup N, from National Geographic
 
 Katherine Borges' The Haplogroup N mtDNA Study at Family Tree DNA
 General
 Ian Logan's Mitochondrial DNA Site

N